SAC Syndikalisterna is a syndicalist trade union federation in Sweden. Unlike other Swedish unions, SAC organises people from all occupations and industries in one single federation, including the unemployed, students, and the retired. SAC also publishes the weekly newspaper  ("the Worker"), owns the publishing house Federativs and runs the unemployment fund  (SAAK).

See also 

 Syndikalistiska Arbetarefederationen
 Anarcho-syndicalism
 Confederación Nacional del Trabajo
 Confederación General del Trabajo (Spain)
 Industrial Workers of the World
 Syndicalist Group Movement

References

Further reading 

 https://www.ne.se/uppslagsverk/encyklopedi/l%C3%A5ng/sac

External links 
  

Anarchist organizations in Sweden
National trade union centers of Sweden
Libertarian socialist organizations
Anarcho-syndicalism
Trade unions established in 1910
1910 establishments in Sweden
Syndicalist trade unions
Labour movement in Sweden
Organizations based in Stockholm